HMS Domett (K473) was a British Captain-class frigate of the Royal Navy in commission during World War II. Originally constructed as the United States Navy Evarts-class destroyer escort USS Eisner (DE-269), she served in the Royal Navy from 1943 to 1946.

Construction and transfer
The ship was assigned the name USS Eisner, the first ship of the name, on 23 February 1943 and laid down as the U.S. Navy destroyer escort DE-269 by the Boston Navy Yard in Boston, Massachusetts, on 7 April 1943. She was launched on 19 May 1943. On 3 September 1943 she was christened by 9-year-old Carol E. Pyne, one of the youngest sponsors in the history of the Boston Navy Yard, and transferred to the United Kingdom under Lend-Lease.

Service history

Commissioned into service in the Royal Navy as HMS Domett (K473) on 3 September 1943 simultaneously with her transfer, the ship served on patrol and escort duty.

The Royal Navy returned Domett to the U.S. Navy on 5 March 1946.

Disposal
The United States sold Domett on 3 June 1947 for scrapping.

References

Navsource Online: Destroyer Escort Photo Archive Eisner (DE-269) HMS Domett (K-473)
uboat.net HMS Domett (K 473)
Captain Class Frigate Association HMS Domett K473 (DE 269)

External links
 Photo gallery of HMS Domett (DE-269)

 

Captain-class frigates
Evarts-class destroyer escorts
World War II frigates of the United Kingdom
World War II frigates and destroyer escorts of the United States
Ships built in Boston
1943 ships